Events from the year 1529 in India.

Events
 May 6 – The Battle of Ghaghra is fought.
 Krishnadevaraya ends his reign as emperor of Vijayanagara Empire.
 Achyuta Deva Raya, brother of Krishnadevaraya, begins his reign as emperor of Vijayanagara Empire.
 Lopo Vaz de Sampaio ends his governance of Portuguese India (which started in 1526).
 Nuno da Cunha became governor of Portuguese possessions in India (until 1538).

Births

Deaths
 Krishnadevaraya, emperor of Vijayanagara Empire (born 1471).

See also

 Timeline of Indian history

References 

 
India